Lilita Zatlere (born 24 February 1953 Riga) is a Latvian businesswoman. She served as the First Lady of Latvia from 2007 to 2011 during the presidency of her husband, Valdis Zatlers.

Biography
Zatlere was born in Riga on 24 February 1953. She attended elementary school in Rīga No. 15 Eight-Year School. She then studied at Rīga Trade Technical School and the Soviet-era People's University. After completing school, Zatlere began working with art at an antiques shop.

Following the restoration of Latvian independence, Lilita Zatlere was appointed to a Riga city commission which focused on compensating Latvians who had lost property during the Soviet occupation. She served on the committee for three years.

Honors and awards
Order of Princess Olga, First Class (June 2008)
Order pro Merito Melitensi of the Sovereign Military Order of Malta (October 2008)
Order of the Cross of Terra Mariana, First Class (April 2009)
Order of Isabella the Catholic
Order of the White Rose of Finland (May 2010)
Order of Vytautas the Great (2011)
National Order of Faithful Service (2011)

References

Living people
1953 births
First ladies and gentlemen of Latvia
Recipients of the Order of Princess Olga, 1st class
Recipients of the Order of the Cross of Terra Mariana, 1st Class
Recipients of the Order of Isabella the Catholic 
Order of the White Rose of Finland
Recipients of the Order of Vytautas the Great
Recipients of the National Order of Faithful Service
Recipients of the Order pro Merito Melitensi
Latvian businesspeople
Latvian women in business
People from Riga
Businesspeople from Riga